Luis Alberto Castillo (born August 4, 1983), is a former American football defensive end in the National Football League (NFL). He was drafted by the Chargers in the first round of the 2005 NFL Draft. He played college football at Northwestern.

Castillo was one of the cover athletes for the Spanish language version of Madden NFL 08.

Early years
Raised in Garfield, New Jersey, Castillo attended Garfield High School, where he was team captain and team MVP of the football team, under coach Steven Mucha.

College career
He attended Northwestern University, where he lived in Elder Hall for his freshman year. He was a 2004 Pro Football Weekly All-American selection, a Second-team All-Big Ten, Academic All-American by ESPN and Second-team Academic All-Big Ten. In 2003, he was a First-team Academic All-District and Academic All-Big Ten. Again, a Second-team Academic All-District by CoSIDA and Academic All-Big Ten in 2002. Castillo finished career with 251 tackles, 4.5 sacks, and 19.5 tackles for loss.

NFL career

2005 NFL Draft
Castillo was selected with the 28th overall pick in the 1st round of the 2005 NFL Draft.

Positive drug test
Castillo made headlines at the 2005 NFL Combine when he sent a letter to all 32 NFL teams admitting to using androstenedione, a steroid hormone which increased the amount of testosterone his body produced, promoting muscle growth and healing in an effort to quicken the rehab process of a slow-healing injury so he could perform in all the drills at the 2005 NFL Combine. He claimed he used the steroids in an attempt to fully recover from an elbow injury suffered in the very first game of his senior year at Northwestern. Castillo hyper-extended his elbow, damaging the ulnar collateral ligament, basically preventing him from using one of his arms. Being the team captain, he felt an obligation to fight through the pain and finish the year.

In an interview with Peter King, Castillo said:
"So I got shot up before games and just endured the pain,["] Castillo told me. "There were a lot of tough moments. The pain was unbelievable. I had the option of taking a medical redshirt after our third game. I could have come back for a fifth year if I stopped playing then. I could have had surgery, and either come back next year and play again, or maybe make it back in time to work out and get ready for the NFL Draft. But I decided to keep playing. I basically played with one arm. My get-off ability was down. I was falling a lot. I wasn't anywhere near the player I could have been, but I played. At the end of the year, I expected I would have surgery and then come back in six or eight months, but then I saw the Bears' team doctor, and he told me that a lot of football players come back from this injury without having the surgery. So I just started rehabbing and thought I'd be ready for the Combine."

After the urine test came back positive, he and his agent wrote the letters to all the teams admitting use of an illegal substance.  Despite this, San Diego Chargers Executive Vice President and General Manager A. J. Smith took a chance on Castillo because of his stellar track record at Northwestern. When asked about Castillo's steroid use, AJ responded, "Let me tell you -- this is a great kid. Did he cheat to try to get ready for the Combine? All of that is true. He has admitted it. He cheated to cut a corner because he was fearful. But I don't believe he gained an advantage [over what he would have been had he not been hurt]. If we wouldn't have picked him, someone else would have -- because he's proven what a good kid he is and this was a one-time mistake.''"

San Diego Chargers (2005-2011)

2005 season
In 2005 Castillo was named an All-Rookie Team selection by NFL.com, Pro Football Weekly/Professional Football Writers of America. Castillo has emerged as a play maker alongside Jamal Williams and Igor Olshansky, creating havoc in opposing backfields. He ended his rookie season with 49 tackles, 3½ sacks, and 3 pass deflections.

2006 season
In the 2006 opening game at the Oakland Raiders ESPN commentator Dick Vermeil called Castillo one of the best young defensive linemen he's seen in a long time. Castillo was a second alternate to the 2006 Pro Bowl. His season totals included playing in 10 games (9 starts) 37 tackles, 7 sacks, and an interception.

2007 season
On November 6, 2007, it was announced that Castillo would miss at least 6 weeks after having surgery on one of his knees. For the 2007 season he again played in 10 games and started nine. He totaled 33 tackles, 2½ sacks and one deflected pass. In 2008, following a tackle of Vince Young, Castillo performed a salsa dance for the crowd. Castillo started in all three playoff appearances for the Chargers, including the AFC Championship against the New England Patriots where he sacked Tom Brady.

2008 season
Castillo signed a five-year, $43.1 million extension in July 2008. His statistics for the season were 16 games played, 15 starts, 39 tackles, 1½ sacks, a pass defensed and an interception (the second of his career).

2009 season
Castillo started and played 14 games with 2 sacks and 25 total tackles. He led the Chargers into the postseason until losing the divisional round to the New York Jets.

2010 season
Castillo started all 16 games in 2010 with 2.5 sacks and 26 total tackles.

2011 season
During Week 1 of the 2011 season, Castillo suffered a broken leg and it prematurely ended his 2011 season. He became a free agent after the season in which he played in only one game.

2012 season
After visiting the New England Patriots, he re-signed with the Chargers on a 1-year deal on April 4, 2012.

However, Castillo was released by the San Diego Chargers on July 19, 2012.

NFL statistics

Key
 GP: games played
 COMB: combined tackles
 TOTAL: total tackles
 AST: assisted tackles
 SACK: sacks
 FF: forced fumbles
 FR: fumble recoveries
 FR YDS: fumble return yards 
 INT: interceptions
 IR YDS: interception return yards
 AVG IR: average interception return
 LNG: longest interception return
 TD: interceptions returned for touchdown
 PD: passes defensed

Personal life
Castillo is fluent in Spanish. He was born in Brooklyn, New York and moved to the Dominican Republic with his mother, Maria, when he was a child. They returned to the United States when he was 5, and the family settled in New Jersey. Luis returns to the Dominican Republic every offseason where he is revered as a national icon. During his trips to the Dominican Republic, Castillo hosts a youth football clinic and does many community appearances. In 2005, he was honored with the Youth of the Year Award for excellence outside of the Dominican Republic.

Castillo has also emerged as a community leader in San Diego. In December 2007, he hosted "Shop with a Charger" for abused and neglected children, some of whom were homeless as well. Each child who participated in the event enjoyed dinner with Luis and his teammates and received a holiday gift card from Walmart.

References

External links

 
 Current stats
 San Diego Chargers bio

1983 births
Living people
American football defensive ends
American football defensive tackles
American sportspeople of Dominican Republic descent
Garfield High School (New Jersey) alumni
Northwestern Wildcats football players
People from Garfield, New Jersey
Players of American football from New Jersey
San Diego Chargers players
Sportspeople from Bergen County, New Jersey
Sportspeople from Brooklyn
Players of American football from New York City